Monday at the Hug & Pint is the fifth studio album by Scottish indie rock band Arab Strap. It was released in Europe on 21 April 2003 by Chemikal Underground and in the United States a day later by Matador Records. The album features appearances from Conor Oberst and Mike Mogis of Bright Eyes and Barry Burns of Mogwai, among others.

The title of the album refers to The Hug & Pint Bar and Club, formerly located in Falkirk, Scotland. An independent live music venue, "The Hug and Pint", on the Great Western Road in Glasgow, was later named after the album.

Reception

In December 2009, Monday at the Hug & Pint placed at number 7 on The Skinny's "Scottish Albums of the Decade". Upon receiving the accolade, Malcolm Middleton stated: 

The Twilight Sad vocalist James Graham lists the album amongst his favourite releases of the 2000s, noting that it was the first Arab Strap album he had listened to and the first album to make him realise that "it was OK to sing in your own accent", while praising Aidan Moffat as "one of the best lyricists of the past two decades".

Track listing

Charts

References

External links
 Official Arab Strap discography

Chemikal Underground albums
Arab Strap (band) albums
2003 albums